Deer's Leap Wood is a nature reserve of the Wildlife Trust for Birmingham and the Black Country, in West Midlands, England. There is woodland with a variety of tree species; also a pond and a meadow area.

Description
The northern boundary is Shireland Brook, historically the county boundary of Staffordshire and Warwickshire. It is in the Rotton Park area of Birmingham; it was in medieval times part of the Rotton Park estate of the de Bermingham family, where there was a deer park.

The reserve has been designated a Site of Local Importance for Nature Conservation.

The woodland has many species of trees, including birch, oak, field maple, wych-elm, hazel, and alder. There is a large pond, where moorhens, mallards and herons can be seen. The meadow, recently established, has many floral species, attracting a variety of insects.

References

Nature reserves in Birmingham, West Midlands
Forests and woodlands of the West Midlands (county)